The Elam Ending is a rules format for basketball. Unlike traditional basketball rules, in which the game is played with four timed quarters, with the Elam Ending format, teams end the game by playing to a target score. A variation used by the NBA G League implements the Elam Ending in games that go into overtime.

Developed by and named for Nick Elam, a professor at Ball State University, the Elam Ending was first used by The Basketball Tournament in 2017. The Elam Ending received widespread attention in 2020 when it was chosen as the format for the NBA All-Star Game.

The concept has since been adapted for soccer.

Format
Instead of a game clock, teams play to a target score, with the shot clock still enforced. The first team to meet or exceed the target score wins, so there is no overtime. The winning score can be a walk-off field goal (two-point or three-point) or a free throw. This format has been compared to how streetball is typically played, as street basketball games are typically played to a target score, e.g. 21 or 15.

Nick Elam devised this system because he was frustrated with stalling and passive play by a leading team and intentionally fouling by a losing team. Elam proposed that his solution, which turns off the game clock, addresses these issues.

History

The Basketball Tournament
In The Basketball Tournament, the game clock is turned off at the first whistle with up to four minutes remaining. In 2017, The Basketball Tournament's play-in games utilized the Elam Ending rules. Since the 2018 edition, the Elam Ending has been used in all games. Originally, the target score was seven points more than team leading or tie score; since 2019, the target score is eight points more than the leading team's/tied score. 

Starting with the 2020 tournament, a rule change was made in order to make a game-ending free throw slightly less likely. If the defensive team commits a non-shooting foul during the Elam Ending with the offensive team in the bonus, the offense receives one free throw plus possession. According to TBT organizers, this eliminated an incentive for teams to foul in one specific situation—when the defense could reach the target score with a free throw or two-point basket while the offense needed a three-pointer. The idea for this change came from a user that Elam interacted with on a message board.

Through the 2019 tournament, Jeremy Pargo of Overseas Elite was the TBT leader in making game-winning shots during the Elam Ending, with five (in the 2018 and 2019 tournaments, Overseas Elite won a total of 10 games). During the 2020 tournament, Golden Eagles forward Jamil Wilson tied his record and ultimately broke it in 2021.

Other uses
At the 2020 NBA All-Star Game, the Elam Ending was introduced after Chris Paul brought up the idea to NBA Commissioner Adam Silver. This version used an untimed fourth quarter, with the target score being 24 points more than the leading team's score after the third. The target score was chosen to honor Kobe Bryant, who was killed in a helicopter crash a month earlier; he wore 24 during his last 10 seasons with the Los Angeles Lakers. In 2020, Team LeBron won the game over Team Giannis 157–155 in a back-and-forth game. The Elam Ending format was received well by fans and players alike. It has since been used for later installments of the event.

In 2020, the Canadian Elite Basketball League (CEBL) adopted the Elam Ending for its CEBL Summer Series tournament (played in lieu of the 2020 season due to the COVID-19 pandemic in Canada), using a target of nine points more than the leading team's score. The change was made permanent in 2021.

The NBA G League adopted the Elam Ending for its 2022–23 season under the name "Final Target Score". For regular-season games, the Elam Ending is implemented once a game goes to overtime, with the first team to score at least 7 points in overtime winning. Games during the G League Winter Showcase, held in December in Las Vegas, employed the Elam Ending after 3 quarters, with the target score set by adding 25 to the leading team's (or tied teams') score.

Soccer adaptation
In October 2022, the organizers of TBT announced that they would hold a spin-off seven-a-side soccer event, The Soccer Tournament (TST), in 2023. TST will use an adaptation of the Elam Ending: after two 20-minute halves, matches will go into "Target Score Time", with a target of one goal more than the leading team's (or tied teams') score. Beginning at the fifth minute of Target Score Time, a player will be removed from each side at 5-minute intervals until the winning goal is scored.

References

External links
 Elam Ending
 About The Elam Ending
Rules of basketball
The Basketball Tournament